Louis Mandylor (born Elias Theodosopoulos; 13 September 1966) is an Australian film and television actor. Mandylor played Nick Portokalos in My Big Fat Greek Wedding (2002), a role he reprised in the sequel My Big Fat Greek Wedding 2 (2016).

Early life
Mandylor was born in Melbourne, Victoria, Australia, the son of Greek immigrants. He is the younger brother of fellow actor Costas Mandylor. He and his brother took a shorter version of their mother's last name, citing their paternal last name as being too long.

He played for Heidelberg United FC (Megas Alexandros) in their 1988 State League championship team. He also played five National League games in 1989 and scored one goal.

During his football career, he was also boxing in Melbourne, winning 14 fights with 4 losses.  He then emigrated to the United States to originally pursue a boxing career and then subsequently an acting career.

Career
Mandylor played Nick Portokalos in My Big Fat Greek Wedding (2002); he reprised the role in its spin-off TV series My Big Fat Greek Life (2003) and the movie sequel My Big Fat Greek Wedding 2 (2016).

He made a guest appearance on Relic Hunter with Tia Carrere. He played Louis Malone in the first season of Martial Law alongside Sammo Hung. Mandylor appeared in the sitcom Friends, pretending to be Joey's twin in "The One With Unagi". He appeared twice on CSI: Miami; in the third season (2004) as a robber/killer, and in a different role in the eighth season (2009).

He and his brother Costas have acted alongside each other in the Charmed episode "Saving Private Leo" (2002), the crime thriller Sinners and Saints (2010) and "My Brother Cicero" (1998), a short movie which Louis wrote and produced. Louis portrayed Deputy Lloyd in the Syfy thriller film The Cursed; he stars alongside his brother Costas. One of his more popular roles was that of Bobby DeLuca in the film Suckers (2001), where he plays a good-guy turned car salesman.

Filmography

Film and TV Movies

Television

References

External links
  (October 2018 archived copy)
 

1966 births
Australian soccer players
Australian people of Greek descent
Greek emigrants to the United States
Australian male film actors
Australian male television actors
Male actors from Melbourne
National Soccer League (Australia) players
Living people
Association footballers not categorized by position